The Gwent County Football Association Senior Cup is the regional knock-out competition for clubs beneath the umbrella of the Gwent County Football Association in South Wales.

Previous winners
Information sourced from the Gwent County Football Association website.

1910s

1919–20: – Abertillery Town

1920s

1920–21: – Newport County
1921–22: – Newport County
1922–23: – Newport County
1923–24: – Newport County
1924–25: – Ebbw Vale
1925–26: – Newport County
1926–27: – Ebbw Vale
1927–28: – Newport County
1928–29: – Ebbw Vale
1929–30: – Lovell's Athletic

1930s

1930–31: – Lovell's Athletic
1931–32: – Newport County
1932–33: – Ebbw Vale
1933–34: – Pontnewydd
1934–35: – Oakdale
1935–36: – Newport County
1936–37: – Lovell's Athletic
1937–38: – Lovell's Athletic
1938–39: – Lovell's Athletic
1939–40: – Monmouth Town

1940s

1940–41: – No competition – World War Two
1941–42: – No competition – World War Two
1942–43: – No competition – World War Two
1943–44: – No competition – World War Two
1944–45: – Cwm Welfare
1945–46: – Ebbw Vale
1946–47: – Lovell's Athletic
1947–48: – Albion Rovers
1948–49: – Lovell's Athletic
1949–50: – Lovell's Athletic

1950s

1950–51: – Ebbw Vale
1951–52: – Lovell's Athletic
1952–53: – Abergavenny Thursdays
1953–54: – Newport County
1954–55: – Lovell's Athletic
1955–56: – Abergavenny Thursdays
1956–57: – Abergavenny Thursdays
1957–58: – Newport County
1958–59: – Newport County
1959–60: – Pontllanfraith

1960s

1960–61: – Abergavenny Thursdays
1961–62: – Pontllanfraith
1962–63: –
1963–64: – Abergavenny Thursdays
1964–65: – Newport County
1965–66: – South Wales Switchgear 
1966–67: – South Wales Switchgear
1967–68: – Newport County
1968–69: – Newport County
1969–70: – Newport County

1970s

1970–71: – Cwmbran R.C.
1971–72: – Newport County
1972–73: – Newport County
1973–74: – Newport County
1974–75: – Newport YMCA
1975–76: – Newport YMCA
1976–77: – Pontnewydd Seniors
1977–78: – Newport YMCA
1978–79: – Aberbargoed Buds
1979–80: – Caldicot Town

1980s

1980–81: – Albion Rovers
1981–82: – Girlings (Cwmbran)
1982–83: – Llanfrechfa Grange
1983–84: – Fields Park Athletic
1984–85: – Risca United
1985–86: – Croesyceiliog
1986–87: – Croesyceiliog
1987–88: – Aberbargoed Buds
1988–89: – Albion Rovers
1989–90: – Pill A.F.C.

1990s

1990–91: – Pill A.F.C.
1991–92: – Abergavenny Thursdays
1992–93: – Caldicot Town
1993–94: – Caerleon
1994–95: – Cwmbran Town
1995–96: – Cwmbran Town
1996–97: – Newport AFC
1997–98: – Newport AFC
1998–99: – Newport AFC
1999–2000: – Newport County

2000s

2000–01: – Newport County
2001–02: – Newport County
2002–03: – Croesyceiliog
2003–04: – Newport County
2004–05: – Newport County
2005–06: – Cwmbran Town
2006–07: – Croesyceiliog
2007–08: – Caldicot Town
2008–09: – Newport Civil Service
2009–10: – Competition suspended

2010s

2010–11: – Newport County
2011–12: – Newport County
2012–13: – Caldicot Town
2013–14: – Goytre
2014–15: – Monmouth Town
2015–16: – Cwmffrwdoer Sports
2016–17: – Malpas United
2017–18: – Abertillery Bluebirds
2018–19: – Cwmbran Town
2019–20: – Competition not completed (Covid-19 pandemic)

2020s

2020–21: – No Competition (Covid-19 pandemic)
2021–22: – Blaenavon Blues

Number of competition wins

Newport County/ Newport AFC – 25
Lovell's Athletic – 10 
Abergavenny Thursdays – 6 
Ebbw Vale – 6 
Caldicot Town – 4 
Croesyceiliog – 4 
Cwmbran Town  – 4 
Pontllanfraith/ South Wales Switchgear – 4 
Albion Rovers – 3 
Newport YMCA – 3 
Aberbargoed Buds – 2 
Monmouth Town – 2 
Pill – 2 
Pontnewydd – 2 
Abertillery Bluebirds – 1 
Abertillery Town – 1 
Blaenavon Blues – 1
Caerleon – 1 
Cwmbran R.C. – 1 
Cwmffrwdoer Sports – 1 
Cwm Welfare – 1 
Fields Park Athletic – 1
Girlings (Cwmbran) – 1 
Goytre – 1 
Llanfrechfa Grange – 1 
Malpas United – 1 
Newport Civil Service – 1 
Oakdale – 1 
Risca United – 1

References

Football cup competitions in Wales
Football in Wales
County Cup competitions
Sport in Monmouthshire